Rooty is the second studio album by English electronic music duo Basement Jaxx, released on 25 June 2001 by record labels XL and Astralwerks in the UK and US respectively.

Like its predecessor Remedy, Rooty was well-received critically and commercially. Five singles were released from the album: "Romeo", "Jus 1 Kiss", "Where's Your Head At", "Get Me Off" and the Australia-only single "Do Your Thing".

Background

Concept and srtwork

The name of the album is taken from Basement Jaxx's regular club event called "Rooty", held at a small bar in Brixton. The cover art features Snowflake, the world's only known albino gorilla.

Felix Burton explained the album's concept as "not geared to one specific vibe. Musically, we made it so that it wasn't just for cokeheads who wanted pounding beats all night," a philosophy that gave the duo "musical freedom". 

As the title for the album, it was explained by the duo as "raw" and "soulful", as well as "about being happy about things that don't fit in" and "things that are a bit different. That's why the album's got an albino gorilla on the cover."

Collaboration
During a July 2000 appearance on TRL, Janet Jackson expressed admiration for Basement Jaxx's debut album Remedy, and contacted the duo to collaborate. Basement Jaxx approached Jackson to collaborate on "Get Me Off" for the album, though the singer ultimately declined. Burton recalled the collaboration attempt as follows: "She told us she loved our stuff, but she thought we were Zero 7. We wished her every success in hooking up with a British dance duo eventually and said, 'Cheerio, Celine.'"

Release 
The album's first single, "Romeo", was released on 4 June 2001.

Rooty was released on 25 June 2001. Further singles released from the album were "Jus 1 Kiss", on 24 September, "Where's Your Head At", on 26 November, "Get Me Off", on 17 June 2002, and "Do Your Thing" in Australia only, on 2 December 2003.

Reception 

Rooty has been well received by critics. John Bush of AllMusic gave it 5 out of 5 stars, calling it "so raw you can't believe they spent over an hour per track, so perfect you're glad they stopped noodling about long before most producers would, and so poppy they should get picked up by commercial radio in America as well as the rest of the world". David Browne of Entertainment Weekly gave it an A− grade and called the album "where heart and feet meet and lovingly coexist". Robert Christgau of Village Voice gave it the same grade, writing "no catchier collection of jingles has come to my attention since Steve Miller made his mint off jet airliners". Billboard said the album "revels in exploiting rhythms that shouldn't work—but definitely do". PopMatterss Andy Hermann was mixed, calling the album "either a brilliantly innovative record, or an unlistenable mess, depending on your point of view".

Pitchfork initial opinion on the album, however, was generally negative. While calling band members Felix Buxton and Simon Ratcliffe "two of the weirdest, most innovative and talented house producers on the scene," reviewer Malcolm Seymour III wrote that "[Basement Jaxx] have taken kitsch too far," noting that the music is "often so tacky that it's impossible to stomach." However, Pitchfork would later name Rooty the 33rd best album of the 2000s.

Q listed Rooty as one of the best 50 albums of 2001. Kludge ranked it at number three on their list of top 10 albums of 2001.

Track listing 
All tracks are written by Felix Buxton and Simon Ratcliffe, except where noted. Songwriting credits adapted from BMI.

Sample credits
 "Breakaway" contains samples of "Lady Sun" and "You Are a Winner", both written by Bernard "Beloyd" Taylor and performed by Earth, Wind & Fire.
 "Jus 1 Kiss" contains samples of "You Can't Do It Alone", written by Bernard Edwards and Nile Rodgers and performed by Chic.
 "Broken Dreams" contains samples of "Costa Brava", written by Digno García and Glen Powell and performed by Felix de Ypacarai y sus Paraguayos.
 "Where's Your Head At" contains samples of "M.E." and "This Wreckage", both written and performed by Gary Numan.
 "Do Your Thing" contains samples of "Fungi Mama", written by Blue Mitchell and performed by Kenny Barron.

Personnel 
Credits for Rooty adapted from album liner notes.

Basement Jaxx
 Felix Buxton – mixing, production, vocals on "Breakaway", "Jus 1 Kiss", "Crazy Girl" and "All I Know"
 Simon Ratcliffe – mixing, production

Additional musicians
 Derrick Carter – vocals on "Get Me Off"
 Cassie – vocals on "Breakaway" and "S.F.M."
 Cherokee – vocals on "Get Me Off"
 Quentin Collins – trumpet on "Broken Dreams"
 Corryne – backing vocals on "Romeo"
 Crystal – vocals on "Get Me Off"
 Damien – vocals on "Where's Your Head At"
 Jill Draper – vocals on "Breakaway"
 Alma Duah – vocals on "Kissalude"
 Kele Le Roc – vocals on "Romeo"
 Lion – vocals on "S.F.M."
 Mandy – vocals on "I Want U" and "Get Me Off"
 Elliot May – vocals on "Do Your Thing"
 Michael Moog – backing vocals on "Where's Your Head At"
 Erick Morillo – backing vocals on "Where's Your Head At"
 Junior Sanchez – backing vocals on "Where's Your Head At"
 Sha – vocals on "Broken Dreams"

Production
 Mike Marsh – mastering

Design
 Anna Boye – photography
 René Habermacher – airbrushing
 Kidney – illustration, typography
 Mat Maitland – art direction, design
 Gerard Saint – art direction, design

Charts

Weekly charts

Year-end charts

Certifications and sales

References

External links 
 

2001 albums
Basement Jaxx albums
XL Recordings albums